Matteo Zingales (born 28 October 1980) is an Australian film music composer who has won the AACTA Award for Best Original Score for a Feature Film for two years running. In 2013, he shared the award with Jono Ma (of rock band Jagwar Ma) for Best Score for Not Suitable for Children (2012), and in 2012, Zingales, Michael Lira and Andrew Lancaster shared the award for Best Score for The Hunter (2011).

Biography
Matteo Zingales was born on 28 October 1980 in Rome and raised in Sydney. He graduated in 2004 from the Australian Film, Television and Radio School with a Masters in Screen Composition. Zingales has cited Thomas Newman, John Barry and Arvo Pärt as his most important musical influences. "When I was nine," he recalls, "I adored movies. I wanted to be a director and then I realised what actually moved me was the music. I just used to sit down at the piano and write".

He has worked across a variety of music platforms. His television credits include the music for over 200 episodes of the series, All Saints (2004–2009), broadcast in fifteen countries, and for all 22 episodes of the first series of Winners & Losers (2011), broadcast in four countries.

He has composed the music for feature films, including collaborating on The Hunter (2011), which starred Willem Dafoe and Sam Neill, and on Not Suitable for Children (2012), which was directed by Peter Templeman and starred Ryan Kwanten (True Blood) and Sarah Snook; for television mini-series including the ABC's Devil's Dust (2012), one of the six parts of the ABC's Redfern Now (2012), and SBS's Better Man (2013); and for short films, such as Blue Poles (2004), starring Sam Worthington. His documentary credits include Lachlan Macquarie: The Father of Australia (2011) for BBC Scotland and The History Channel; and he has composed music for television advertisements.

In February 2008 the Sydney Morning Heralds Mark Chipperfield included Zingales as one of Australia's top thirteen "new talents breaking ground in their chosen fields".

He is a co-founder and director of Sonar Music, the leading Australian music composers' collective.

Awards and nominations

ARIA Music Awards

The ARIA Music Awards is an annual awards ceremony that recognises excellence, innovation, and achievement across all genres of Australian music.

! 
|-
| 2020
| Mystery Road (with Antony Partos)
| Best Original Soundtrack, Cast or Show Album
| 
| 
|-
| 2022
| A Fire Inside
| Best Original Soundtrack, Cast or Show Album
| 
|

Wins

2011 APRA Australia Screen Music Award for Best Music for a Documentary for Lachlan Macquarie: The Father of Australia (2011).

2012 Australian Academy AACTA Award for Best Original Score for The Hunter (2011).  Award shared with Michael Lira and Andrew Lancaster.

2013 Australian Academy AACTA Award for Best Original Score for Not Suitable for Children (2012).  Award shared with Jono Ma (of rock band Jagwar Ma).

2016 APRA Australia Screen Music Award for Feature Film Score of the Year for 99 Homes (2014).  Award shared with Antony Partos.

2016 Australian Academy AACTA Award for Best Original Music Score in Television for The Kettering Incident (2016).  Award shared with Max Lyandvert.

Nominations

2007 APRA Australia Screen Music Award for Best Music for a Television Series for All Saints: TV Series (2007).

2012 Film Critics Circle of Australia Award for Best Music Score for a Feature Film for The Hunter (2011).  Nomination shared with Michael Lira and Andrew Lancaster.

2012 APRA Australia Screen Music Award for Best Music for a Mini-Series or Telemovie for Dripping in Chocolate (2012).

2013 Film Critics Circle of Australia Award for Best Music Score for Not Suitable for Children (2012).  Nomination shared with Jono Ma.

2016 APRA Australia Screen Music Award for Best Music for a Mini-Series or Telemovie for DNA Nation (2016).

References

External links
 
 

1980 births
APRA Award winners
Australian film score composers
Australian Film Television and Radio School alumni
Living people
Male film score composers
Italian emigrants to Australia